"Baby Girl" is a debut song co-written and recorded by American country music group Sugarland. Originally released in 2003 as part of Premium Quality Tunes, it was re-released in July 2004 as the first single from the album Twice the Speed of Life. The single reached a peak position of number 2 on the Billboard Hot Country Singles & Tracks (now Hot Country Songs) charts in April 2005. The song spent a total of 46 weeks on the country music charts; setting a new record for the longest chart run since the inception of Nielsen SoundScan digital chart tabulation in 1990. In addition, "Baby Girl" became the highest-peaking debut single for a country music group in 14 years. It was written by group members Jennifer Nettles, Kristian Bush, and Kristen Hall, along with Troy Bieser.

Chart performance
"Baby Girl" entered the Billboard Hot Country Singles & Tracks chart at number 56 on the chart week of July 24, 2004. The single reached its peak position of number 2 on the chart week of April 2, 2005, a position that it held for two weeks. "Baby Girl" became the highest-charting debut single for a country group since 1991. It also set a new record for the longest chart run since the inception of Nielsen SoundScan in 1990, spending 46 weeks on the charts. Joel Whitburn's book Hot Country Songs 1944-2008 contradicts this record, citing Gary Allan's "Right Where I Need to Be" as the record-holder for this era with a 48-week run. In the same book, "Baby Girl" is tied with Diamond Rio's 2002 single "Beautiful Mess" and Carrie Underwood's "Before He Cheats" as the second-longest chart run in this era, Underwood's chart run having come in 2006 and 2007.  The song has sold 827,000 copies in the US as of April 2013.

Year-end charts

Personnel
As listed in liner notes.
Tom Bukovac – electric guitar
Brandon Bush – organ
Kristian Bush – mandolin, background vocals
Chad Cromwell – drums
Dan Dugmore – electric guitar, pedal steel guitar, lap steel guitar
Kristen Hall – acoustic guitar, background vocals
Greg Morrow – tambourine
Jennifer Nettles – lead vocals, background vocals
Glenn Worf – bass guitar

References

2004 debut singles
2004 songs
Sugarland songs
Songs written by Kristian Bush
Songs written by Jennifer Nettles
Songs written by Kristen Hall
Song recordings produced by Garth Fundis
Music videos directed by Peter Zavadil
Mercury Nashville singles